Bogovinje is a municipality in the western part of the Republic of North Macedonia. Bogovinje is also the name of the village where the municipal seat is found. Bogovinje Municipality is part of the Polog Statistical Region.

Geography
The municipality borders Tetovo Municipality to the north, Brvenica Municipality to the east, Vrapčište Municipality to the south, and Kosovo to the west.

Demographics
The number of the inhabited places in the municipality is 15. According to the last national census from 2021 this municipality has 22,906 inhabitants.

References

External links

 
Polog Statistical Region
Albanian communities in North Macedonia
Municipalities of North Macedonia